Martin Bremer (born 11 May 1954) is a retired German football striker.

References

1954 births
Living people
German footballers
SV Darmstadt 98 players
SV Waldhof Mannheim players
FSV Frankfurt players
Association football forwards
Bundesliga players
2. Bundesliga players
SV Darmstadt 98 managers